Temple is a British medical crime drama television series. Created by Mark O'Rowe, and starring Mark Strong, Carice Van Houten and Daniel Mays, it is based on the Norwegian drama Valkyrien, and premiered 13 September 2019 on Sky One.

On 1 November 2019, Sky renewed Temple for a second series, which began airing on 28 October 2021.

Synopsis
In a labyrinth of abandoned service tunnels below Temple Underground Station, Daniel Milton  (Mark Strong), a highly respected surgeon, runs an illegal medical clinic that treats criminals and other desperate patients who cannot or will not seek help from regular medical facilities. Daniel sets up the clinic to find a cure for his wife, Beth (Catherine McCormack), who suffers from a terminal illness. Lee (Daniel Mays), a Temple station staff member, and Anna (Carice van Houten), a medical researcher, help him run the clinic. The series focuses on the secrecy, exits and issues of trust as the clinic treats its patients as well as Daniel's need for money to fund his research.

Cast and characters

Main
Mark Strong as Daniel Milton, a brilliant surgeon who is willing to provide illegal medical care to fund his covert care of his wife and research into finding a cure for her illness.
Daniel Mays as Lee Simmons, a transport network employee and "doomsday prepper", who helps Daniel establish an illegal underground clinic.
Carice van Houten as Anna Willems, a medical researcher and friend of Beth, who had an affair with Daniel in the past and reluctantly assists him with his underground clinic.
Catherine McCormack as Beth Milton, Daniel's wife and a medical research scientist, who is suffering from a terminal case of Lancaster's Disease.
Lily Newmark as Eve Milton, Daniel and Beth's 19-year-old daughter who is studying at university.
Tobi King Bakare as Jamie Harris, a fugitive bank robber.
Wunmi Mosaku as Mercy King, the mother of bank robber Sebastian King.
Craig Parkinson as Keith Sullivan, a criminal enforcer and ex-lover of Mercy King.
Chloe Pirrie as DI Karen Hall.
Ryan McKen as DI (demoted to DS in series 2) Rob Moloney.
Siena Kelly as Michelle Wilson, Jamie's pregnant girlfriend.
Claire Rushbrook as Gloria Wilson, Michelle's mother.

Recurring
Theo Solomon as Sebastian King, a bank robber.
Kate Dickie as Eleanor, Beth and Anna's boss.
Anamaria Marinca as Suzanna, an employee at Daniel's hospital who becomes one of his patients.
Turlough Convery as Simon Reynolds.
Mark Bazeley as Michael Chander, a fellow doctor and friend of Daniel's.
Sam Hazeldine as Jack Lorean, Anna's boyfriend.
Steffan Rhodri as Jeremy, Lee's manager.
Jan Bijvoet as Clive, a criminal connected to the black market organ trade.
Johann Myers as Nick, a criminal connected to the black market organ trade.
Ruhtxjiaïh Bèllènéa as Ash Falomo, an activist friend of Eve's.
Rhys Ifans as Gubby, a fixer in London's criminal underworld.
Michael Smiley as Dermot, an associate of Gubby.
Michael Akinsulire as Tommy, one of Daniel's patients.
Mandeep Dhillon as DI Kam Skinner, Rob's sister.

Guest
Donald Sumpter as George, a clinic patient.
Martin McCann as Cormac, a clinic patient.
Marion Bailey as Ingrid.
Jo Hartley as Professor Kirby.

Episodes

Series Overview

Season 1 (2019)

Season 2 (2021)

Broadcast 
On 13 February 2020, Temple was picked up by the video on-demand services of U.S. cable provider Charter Communications via its Spectrum Originals banner. The second series was made available in its entirety to Spectrum subscribers on 1 November 2021.

In Canada, the series was acquired by Showcase.

References

External links

2019 British television series debuts
2021 British television series endings
2010s British drama television series
2010s British medical television series
2020s British drama television series
2020s British medical television series
British crime drama television series
English-language television shows
Sky UK original programming
Television shows set in England